Bala Marzbal (also Romanized as Bālā Marzbāl) is a village in Gatab-e Jonubi Rural District, Gatab District, Babol County, Mazandaran Province, Iran. At the 2006 census, its population was 149, in 36 families.

References 

Populated places in Babol County